Lort River is a river located in the Goldfields-Esperance region and the Eastern Mallee sub-region of Western Australia.

Lort River was named in 1848 by John Septimus Roe the Surveyor General of Western Australia while leading a five-man exploration expedition along the coast, commemorating John Lort Stokes' work on  surveying the Western Australian coast.

The headwaters of the Lort River begin in the Peak Charles National Park and its surrounding vacant Crown land. The river then enters the Stokes National Park before discharging into Stokes Inlet.

Both the river and the inlet were named by John Septimus Roe while exploring and surveying the area in 1848 after his friend Admiral John Lort Stokes.

The catchment of the river has been extensively cleared for Agricultural purposes. It is estimated that 60% of the catchment has been cleared; this has led to increased sedimentation, eutrophication and  salinity levels of the river.

References

Rivers of the Goldfields-Esperance region
Shire of Esperance